Cuspivolva is a genus of sea snails, marine gastropod mollusks in the subfamily Eocypraeninae of the family Ovulidae.

Species
Species within the genus Cuspivolva include:
Cuspivolva allynsmithi (Cate, 1978)
Cuspivolva bellica (Cate, 1973)
Cuspivolva celzardi (Fehse, 2008)
Cuspivolva cuspis (Cate, 1973)
Cuspivolva draperi Cate & Azuma in Cate, 1973
Cuspivolva habui (Cate, 1973)
Cuspivolva helenae (Cate, 1973)
Cuspivolva mucronata (Azuma & Cate, 1971)
Cuspivolva ostheimerae (Cate, 1973)
Cuspivolva paulwatsoni Fehse & Lorenz, 2013
Cuspivolva platysia (Cate, 1973)
 Cuspivolva pulcherrima Fehse, 2019
Cuspivolva queenslandica (Cate, 1974)
 Cuspivolva singaporica Fehse & Koh, 2016
Cuspivolva singularis (Cate, 1973)
Cuspivolva tigris (Yamamoto, 1971)
Species inquirenda
Cuspivolva narinosa (Cate, 1973)
Species brought into synonymy
Cuspivolva formosa (Sowerby in A. Adams & Reeve, 1848): synonym of Primovula formosa (G. B. Sowerby II in Adams & Reeve, 1848)

References

 Fehse D. & Lorenz F. 2013. A new species in the genus Cuspivolva Cate, 1973 (Mollusca: Gastropoda: Ovulidae). Conchylia 43(1-4): 113-117

Ovulidae
Gastropod genera